Nkwanta is a town and is the District capital of Nkwanta South Municipal District, a municipal in the Oti Region of Ghana.

Education
Nkwanta is currently known for numerous basic schools and 4 major second-cycle institutions namely; Nkwanta Senior High School, Nkwanta Community Senior High Technical School, Kyabobo Girls' School and Mist Senior High Technical School.

See also
Nkwanta South District
Nkwanta South (Ghana parliament constituency)

References

External links and sources
 Nkwanta South District on GhanaDistricts.com

Populated places in the Oti Region